Spanish House may refer to:

 Spanish House, Reed College, Portland, Oregon
 The Spanish House, West Hartford, Connecticut